Burnalle James Hayes (August 2, 1903 – November 29, 1969), nicknamed "Bun", was an American Negro league pitcher from 1928 to 1935.

A native of Louisburg, North Carolina, Hayes attended Johnson C. Smith University and North Carolina Central University. He made his Negro leagues debut in 1928 with the Baltimore Black Sox. Hayes played for Baltimore through 1930, and returned to Baltimore for two more seasons in 1933 and 1934. He finished his career in 1935, splitting time between the Brooklyn Eagles and Newark Dodgers. Hayes died in Louisburg in 1969 at age 66.

References

External links
 and Baseball-Reference Black Baseball stats and Seamheads

1903 births
1969 deaths
Baltimore Black Sox players
Brooklyn Eagles players
Chicago American Giants players
Newark Dodgers players
Washington Pilots players
20th-century African-American sportspeople
Baseball pitchers